Cataulacus granulatus, is a species of ant of the subfamily Myrmicinae, which is a widespread species that can be found from Borneo, China, India, Indonesia, Malaysia, Myanmar, Nepal, Thailand, Singapore, and Sri Lanka.

References

External links

 at antwiki.org
Itis.gov
Animaldiversity.org

Myrmicinae
Hymenoptera of Asia
Insects described in 1802